Batumi (formerly Batum) is a city on the Black Sea coast and capital of Adjara, an autonomous republic in southwest Georgia. The city was under Russian rule at the beginning of World War I, but local unrest led to Turkey entering the city in April 1918, followed by the British in December, who stayed until July 1920.

History
During the British occupation, the stock of postage stamps started to run out, and so in February 1919 the administration produced its own stamps. These were imperforate, depicted an aloe tree and were inscribed БАТУМСКАЯ ПОЧТА (BATUMSKAYA POCHTA),  or "Batum Post."

The British later overprinted these with "BRITISH OCCUPATION", and surcharged the remaining Russian stamps in a variety of styles.  Inflation also took hold, and by 1920, the tree stamps, which had been as little as 5 kopecks, had to be reprinted in denominations up to 50 rubles.

Despite the short period of British rule, the tree stamps exist in large numbers, but the overprinted Russian stamps are not common, and in 2003 some commanded prices of over US$500.

Numerous philatelic forgeries exist of both the basic stamps and the overprints.

See also
Revenue stamps of Batum

References

Sources
Stanley Gibbons Ltd: various catalogues
Rossiter, Stuart & John Flower. The Stamp Atlas. London: Macdonald, 1986. 
Barefoot, John & Andrew Hall, Georgia. European Philately 11. York (Barefoot) 1983. Batum British Occupation pp. 44–51. - ISBN 090684519X.

Further reading
W. E. Hughes, Postage Stamps of Batum.
Dr.R.J. Ceresa, "Forgery Guide No.11, Batum-British Occupation-The Aloe Tree Types" August 2007.
Dr.R.J. Ceresa, "Forgery Guide No.17/18, "Batum-British Occupation-Overprinted Russian stamps' August  2008.

External links
 AskPhil – Glossary of Stamp Collecting Terms
 Encyclopaedia of Postal History

Batum
Postal system of Georgia (country)
Batumi